Macaria aequiferaria, the woody angle moth, is a moth of the family Geometridae. The species was first described by Francis Walker in 1861. It is found in North America, where it has been recorded from Maryland, and Delaware to Florida, west to Texas, as well as in Oklahoma, Mississippi, Kentucky and southern Illinois. It is also found in Mexico.

Adults have been recorded on wing year round, with most records between March and September.

The larvae feed on Taxodium species.

References

Moths described in 1861
Macariini